Nirbhay is a 1996 Indian Hindi-language action thriller film directed by Vinod Dewan, starring Mithun Chakraborty, Sangeeta Bijlani, Sadashiv Amrapurkar, Kulbhushan Kharbanda, Anupam Kher, Paresh Rawal and Kiran Kumar. Infamous Mumbai bar girl, Tarannum Khan, may have a small role in this movie. This was before she shot to fame due to her involvement in cricket betting syndicates.

Plot 
The movie revolves with a story of innocent young man who is entrapped and convicted in a murder case. After release from jail he knows the truth and he takes revenge on those person behind the plot.

Cast
Mithun Chakraborty
Sangeeta Bijlani
Sadashiv Amrapurkar
Kulbhushan Kharbanda
Anupam Kher
Paresh Rawal
Kiran Kumar
Tarannum Khan

Music
"O Babu Zara Dil De" - Udit Narayan, Sadhana Sargam
"Tujhe Dekh Ke" - Vinod Rathod, Sadhana Sargam
"Channa Mere Channa" - Suresh Wadkar, Sadhana Sargam
"Nirbhay Nirbhay Nirbhay" - Rafique Shaikh
"Maa Kya Karegi" - Suresh Wadkar, Sadhana Sargam, Vinod Rathod, Simi Mishra
"Kaiko Hairan Karta" - Suresh Wadkar, Kavita Krishnamurthy

References

External links

1996 films
1990s Hindi-language films
Mithun's Dream Factory films
Films shot in Ooty
Indian action thriller films